Romvelope (Bjorn Hatleskog) is a Scots Norwegian experimental musician and sound artist based in London. His work explores the nature of feedback loops and, noise and interference.  Romvelope's music has been released on several independent record labels including Adaadat, Seed Records, Benbecula Records, Invitro and Rolax Records.  His music was also featured on The Wire Magazine's Wire Tapper CD compilation series.   Bjorn Hatleskog's sound sculptures have been exhibited at the De La Warr Pavilion,
 and the Kinetica Artfair.

Discography

Albums
One Course Meal, 2005, Adaadat
Mountains of Mayonnaise, 2014, Adaadat
Bespoke Action Plantation, 2014, Adaadat

EPs
Cow'p vs Kema Keur, 2003, Adaadat

Singles
Seed 5x5, 2006, Seed Records
Fanfaronade b/w Afterclap, 2012, Adaadat
Catomountain b/w Hodmandod, 2013, Adaadat

Compilations
Alba Absurdia, 2002, Benbecula Records
Trade and Distribution Almanac Vol. 1, 2003, Adaadat
Trade and Distribution Almanac Vol. 2, 2005, Adaadat
Trade and Distribution Almanac Vol. 3, 2006, Adaadat
Rolax Snax, 2007, Rolax Records
Jean-Jacques Perrey & Cosmic Pocket - Froots Juice, 2008, Invitro Records
Seed X, 2011, Seed Records
The Wire Tapper 32, 2013, The Wire Magazine
Fractal Meat Cuts Volume One, 2014, Adaadat

References

External links
Official Site
Discogs

Experimental composers
Male classical composers
20th-century male musicians